Renato Miglioli (October 3, 1921 in Caronno Varesino – 2007) was an Italian professional football player.

1921 births
2007 deaths
Italian footballers
Serie A players
Catania S.S.D. players
Atalanta B.C. players
Inter Milan players
Novara F.C. players
L.R. Vicenza players
U.S. Cremonese players
Association football midfielders
S.G. Gallaratese A.S.D. players